Ana Lara (born 30 November 1959) is a Mexican composer.

Life 
She also studied ethnomusicology at the University of Maryland, graduating with a Master of Arts degree.

After completing her studies, Lara worked as a composer and music producer. In 1989 she began producing a Mexico City University Radio (Radio UNAM) contemporary music program, and in 2000 she was nominated as Best Classical Album Producer at the Latin Grammy Awards. She founded and served as artistic director of Mexico's International Festival Música y Escena, and served as artistic director of the Puebla Instrumenta Verano 2004 summer courses. She also teaches music and seminars on Latin American and twentieth century music.

Works 
Selected works include:

1996 Y la marcha de la humanidad? for stage. Choreography by  Alicia Sánchez
1998 Más allá for stage
1999 Viejas Historias for stage. Choreography by Rossana Filomarino
2000 Celebraciones for stage. Choreography by Rossana Filomarino
2002 Elles for stage. Choreography by Luoise Bédard
1997 Requiem, for choir a cappella
1986 Two etudes, piano
1990 Saga, harp
1992 Pegaso, harpsichord, piano or organ
2006 Recuerdos del poeta, piano
2007 Cake walk (Caminata de pastelito)
1985 In Memoriam, cello and G flute
1992 Vitrales, viola, cello and doublebass
1992 O mar, maré, bateaux, guitar four hands or two guitars
1998-1999 Darkness Visible, flute, clarinet/Bs clarinet, violin, viola, cello, base, piano and percussion
2000 Estudios Rítmicos, for percussion quartet
2001 Vértigos, trio for c and alto flutes, clarinet and bass clarinet and piano
2005 Epitafios y otras muertes for baritone and piano
2005 Serenata for wind quintet and string quintet
2006-2007 Sagitario, Capricornio, Acuario for large ensemble
2007 Dylan y las ballenas, 8 celli and narrator
1989 La Víspera for orchestra
1990-1991 Desasosiego,  mezzo/actress and chamber orchestra
1993-1994 Angeles de llama y hielo, for orchestra
2003-2004 Dos visiones, for orchestra
2006 Concerto for bassett horn
2007 Cuatro habitantes, for percussion quartet and orchestra
2008-2009 Altre Lontananze, concerto for organ and orchestra
2018 Of Bronze and Blaze for wind ensemble

References 

1959 births
20th-century classical composers
Living people
Mexican women classical composers
Mexican classical composers
Mexican music educators
Women music educators
20th-century women composers